Sutter is an unincorporated community in Hancock County, Illinois, United States. Sutter had a post office, which closed on July 23, 1994.

References

Unincorporated communities in Hancock County, Illinois
Unincorporated communities in Illinois